The 2004 ICF World Junior Canoe Slalom Championships were the 10th edition of the ICF World Junior Canoe Slalom Championships. The event took place in Lofer, Austria from 3 to 4 July 2004 under the auspices of the International Canoe Federation (ICF).

No medals were awarded for the C2 event and the C2 team event due to not meeting the minimum participation criteria according to ICF. The C2 event only had participants from 2 continents (3 were required), while the C2 team event only had 5 teams participating (6 were required).

Medal summary

Men

Canoe

Kayak

Women

Kayak

Medal table

References

External links
International Canoe Federation

ICF World Junior Canoe Slalom Championships
ICF World Junior and U23 Canoe Slalom Championships